Moldova competed at the 2017 World Championships in Athletics in London, United Kingdom, from 4 to 13 August 2017.

Results
(q – qualified, NM – no mark, SB – season best)

Men
Field events

Women
Field events

References

Nations at the 2017 World Championships in Athletics
World Championships in Athletics
Moldova at the World Championships in Athletics